Pentaphylax euryoides is a species of flowering plant in the Pentaphylacaceae family that can in be found on Sumatra and in such countries as Malaysia, Vietnam and China. In China, it is found in such provinces as Guangdong, Guangxi, Guizhou, Hainan, Yunnan, and in southern parts of Fujian, Hunan, and Jiangxi.

Description

References

External links

Further reading

Pentaphylacaceae
Flora of China
Flora of Peninsular Malaysia
Flora of Sumatra
Flora of Vietnam